Cyprinodon arcuatus (Santa Cruz pupfish) is a species of fish in the family Cyprinodontidae. It was endemic to the Santa Cruz River in Arizona. It has been declared extinct as of 2011.

Description
The Santa Cruz pupfish exhibited sexual dimorphism in size, with males averaging 37mm (1.46in) in length and females averaging 32mm (1.26in) in length. Coloration in breeding males was dark green to black with alternating stripes of light and dark. Female and non-breeding males were reported to have clear fins except for a black dorsal fin. C. arcuatus is differentiated from other Cyprinodon  species by a highly convex dorsal body and concave post-dorsal body, as well a lack of orange or yellow in breeding males' fins.

References

arcuatus
Taxa named by Wendell L. Minckley
Taxa named by Robert Rush Miller
Fish described in 2002
Endemic fauna of Arizona
Fish of the Western United States
Freshwater fish of the United States
Fish of North America becoming extinct since 1500